Nexus Audio Recording Studio is a recording studio located in East Oakland, California. It was established in October 2004 by Chris Paxton, who presently owns, manages, and is the head engineer. The seven-room facility offers tracking, mixing and mastering for all audio projects, including musical genres as diverse as reggae and rock. Nexus is frequently used by artists in the San Francisco Bay Area urban music scene, and recording acts have included Kreayshawn, Mistah F.A.B, Spice 1, Turf Talk, Clyde Carson and Shock G.

History

Building
1833 Solano Way, Oakland, CA, was built in the early 1920s, and became a recording studio in the early 1970s. Its central location to the Bay Area made it a destination for local and national acts such as Carlos Santana and Primus, who both used it for recording and rehearsals.

From 1996 to 2000, the studio was called Microdot Recording Studio under the ownership of engineer Jerry Smith. The floorplan and decor of the facility has stayed relatively unchanged, and includes a 20'x24'live room and 5'x5'isolated vocal booth. In June 2005, an additional three rooms serving as a control room, machine room, and ISO booth were added to the facility.

Nexus Audio
Drummer and engineer Chris Paxton (Kung Fu Vampire) purchased Microdot Studio in October 2005. A year later Nexus opened as a public recording studio, and the first album from the new facility was released in March 2007, titled The Connection.

The Live Room was given a new hardwood floor in July 2008, and in April 2009 there was a digital audio workstation upgrade to Pro Tools HD2. Nexus acquired adjacent rehearsal space for non-recording purposes in October 2010. One month later acoustic improvements were added to the main live room and control room. In September 2011 the rehearsal space began conversion into a mixing suite, and there were seven rooms total.

The Nexus track "Hands Up" by Erk tha Jerk started receiving regular radio rotation on 106.1 KMEL in April 2011. Later that summer, Kreayshawn's track "Gucci, Gucci" received over 5,000,000 views on YouTube, and the artist signed with Columbia Records/Sony Music Entertainment. Kung Fu Vampire recorded Love Bites at Nexus in July 2012, making the session into a short documentary.

Key staff 
Chris Paxton: Owner/Head Engineer - graduate of Ex'pression College for Digital Arts with BAS in Sound Arts/Audio Engineering, Paxton has 14 years as a formally trained drummer. As of 2013 he is playing with Kung Fu Vampire, Conscious Souls, Whogas, Nexus and Rap is a Joke. He is endorsed by Amedia Cymbals, Axis Percussion and May International.
Don Reynolds: Engineer - a graduate of Ex'pression College for Digital Arts with BAS in Sound Arts/Audio Engineering
Anthony "Ant" Petty: Engineer - graduate of Ex’pression College for Digital Arts with BAS in Sound Arts.

Clients
The following is a list of past and/or present clients at Nexus:

Discography

References

External links

Nexus Audio Official Website
Nexus Audio on Facebook (Official)

Recording studios in California
Companies based in Oakland, California